SketchPad is a coworking space in Chicago for Jewish nonprofits.

References

External links

Coworking space providers
Jewish organizations based in the United States
Organizations based in Chicago